Jasdev Singh (1930/31 – 25 September 2018) was an Indian sports commentator. He was awarded Padma Shri in 1985 and Padma Bhushan in 2008. He died on 25 September 2018. He was also an official commentator on Independence Day, and Republic Day parade broadcasts from 1963 for state-run media, Doordarshan and also All India Radio. He joined All Indian Radio Jaipur in 1955, and moved to Delhi after eight years, thereafter he joined Doordarshan, where he worked for over 35 years.

Over the years, he covered nine Olympics, eight hockey World Cups and six Asian Games, and was awarded the Olympic Order, the highest award of the Olympic movement, by Juan Antonio Samaranch, IOC president.

References

Recipients of the Padma Bhushan in other fields
Recipients of the Padma Shri in civil service
1930s births
2018 deaths
Sportspeople from Jaipur
Field hockey commentators
Indian sports broadcasters
All India Radio people
Indian radio journalists
Radio and television announcers
Doordarshan journalists
Recipients of the Olympic Order
20th-century Indian journalists
Journalists from Rajasthan
Indian radio presenters
Writers from Jaipur